Paula Arias Manjón (born 26 February 2000) is a Spanish tennis player.

Arias Manjón won the 2016 French Open girls' doubles title, partnering with Olga Danilović. They defeated Olesya Pervushina and Anastasia Potapova in the final.

ITF Circuit finals

Singles: 1 (runner–up)

Doubles: 6 (3 titles, 3 runner–ups)

Junior Grand Slam finals

Girls' doubles:  1 (title)

Notes

References

External links
 
 

2000 births
Living people
Spanish female tennis players
French Open junior champions
Grand Slam (tennis) champions in girls' doubles
21st-century Spanish women